is a 1952 Japanese drama film directed by Senkichi Taniguchi. It stars Shirley Yamaguchi and Toshirō Mifune. It was produced by Toho Studios. The film, based on a novel by Jirō Osaragi, is about a Japanese woman, the lover of an American, who falls in love with her servant.

Cast
Shirley Yamaguchi as Chiyo (Hana) 
Toshirô Mifune as Chiyokichi
Bob Booth as Takashi Shimura 		
Fuyuki Murakami 			
Noriko Sengoku

References

External links 
 

1952 films
Japanese drama films
1952 drama films
Films directed by Senkichi Taniguchi
Japanese black-and-white films
1950s Japanese films